116 Squadron of the Israeli Air Force, also known as The Lions of the South Squadron (former Flying Wing, and Defenders of the South Squadron), is an F-16A/B and F-35 fighter squadron based at Nevatim Airbase.

References 

Israeli Air Force squadrons